The Huansu S3 is a 7-seat Compact SUV produced by Huansu, a sub-brand of BAIC Motor.

Overview 
The Huansu S3 is the 7-seat variant of the Huansu S2 5-seat compact SUV, both manufactured by Beiqi Yinxiang Automobile. It debuted at the 2014 Beijing Auto Show. The Huansu S3 is powered by a 1.5 liter inline-four engine producing 113hp, with the engine mated to a 5-speed manual gearbox.

Huansu S3L 
The Huansu S3L is essentially the longer version of the regular Huansu S3, featuring a restyled front and rear end and a longer side DLO.
The Huansu S3L has a length of 4380mm and a wheelbase of 2700mm which is longer than the Huansu S3 by 140mm with a wheelbase that is 15mm longer than the Huansu S3.

Ruixiang X3 
The Ruixiang X3 is the second vehicle of the Ruixiang brand and it is a rebadge based on the Huansu S3L crossover with a redesigned front end. The Ruixiang X3 is powered by a 1.5-litre naturally aspirated engine producing 77 kW mated to a 5-speed manual transmission.

References

External links 

 Official Website

Cars introduced in 2014
Compact sport utility vehicles
Rear-wheel-drive vehicles
2010s cars
Cars of China